Daniel Gerard Birmingham (born May 26, 1968) is an American lawyer and politician from New York. He was the Chairman of the nine-member County Legislature in Putnam County, New York. He is  an attorney with a Wall Street law firm, practicing in the area of municipal and public finance.

He earned his Juris Doctor (J.D.) from the Catholic University of America in 1995 and a B.A. from the same university in 1990.
After graduating from law school, Birmingham was appointed deputy county executive under Robert Bondi from 1994–98. Prior to being elected to the County Legislature, Birmingham was a two-term member of the Village Board of Trustees of Brewster, New York.

From 1995 to 1998, he served as the Chairman of the Putnam County Industrial Development Agency in New York.

Legislative career
Birmingham, a Republican, was elected to the first of three terms with the County Legislature in November 2003, succeeding Robert Pozzi who had been elected as Carmel, New York Town Supervisor. Birmingham defeated David Bruen, Putnam's first County Executive, by 143 votes and Southeast Supervisor Lois Zutell who ran on the Conservative Party line (and received 157 votes).

Birmingham was re-elected to the County Legislature in November 2006 with 94 percent of the vote, beating Norman Marino.

In January 2006, he was unanimously elected as Chairman of the County Legislature. During his tenure as Chairman, Birmingham shepherded through several major pieces of legislation, including designation of Putnam County as a New York State Empire Zone, as well as beginning the recodification and modernization of the County's Ethics Code. On November 3, 2009 and having no opposition, Birmingham was elected to a third term on the County Legislature with 100% of the vote.

He served as assistant to County Executive Robert Bondi from 1991–1993, then returned to law school.

References

1968 births
Living people
Columbus School of Law alumni
County legislators in New York (state)
People from Brewster, New York
People from Carmel, New York
New York (state) Republicans
People from Brooklyn
Catholic University of America alumni
21st-century American politicians
21st-century American lawyers
20th-century American lawyers
20th-century American politicians